Ipil may refer to:

Places
 Ipil, Zamboanga Sibugay, a 1st class municipality and capital of the province of Zamboanga Sibugay, Philippines
 Ipil, an administrative division in Taal, Batangas, Philippines
 Ipil, an administrative division in Jagna, Bohol, Philippines

Other uses
 Ipil (plant), a tropical flowering tree

See also
Ipil-ipil, a tropical flowering tree